Eulepidotis phrygionia is a moth of the family Erebidae first described by George Hampson in 1926. It is found in the Neotropics, including Colombia.

References

Moths described in 1926
phrygionia